Mahmoud Tawfik (born 1961) is an Egyptian politician and police officer. He serves as the Egyptian Minister of Interior.

Career 
Tawfik joined the Egyptian police and graduated from the Police Academy in 1982. Following his graduation, Tawfik worked for various Egyptian security agencies under the control of the Egyptian Ministry of Interior. He started working for the Cairo Security Directorate, before joining the State Security Investigations Service and later its successor agency, the National Security Agency in 2011. 

At the National Security Agency, he served as director of the agency's external operations department before becoming deputy director in 2015. Tawfiq was involved in counter-terrorism activities, especially against Islamist groups, including the Muslim Brotherhood. 

On 29 October 2017, Tawfik was promoted to director of the National Security Agency by then Minister of Interior Magdy Abdel Ghaffar after insurgents killed several police officers in an ambush in the Egyptian Western Desert. During his time as director, Amnesty International reported that the agency was responsible for large scale human rights violations including torturing, abducting and killing members of the opposition without trial.

On June 14, 2018, President Abdel Fattah el-Sisi reshuffled key ministries and appointed Tawfiq as Minister of Interior.

References 

1961 births
Living people
Interior Ministers of Egypt
Egyptian police officers
21st-century Egyptian politicians